Fútbol Club Martinenc is a Spanish football team based in Barcelona in the autonomous community of Catalonia. Founded in 1909, it plays in Primera Catalana – Group 1, holding home games at Camp Municipal del Guinardó.

Season to season

36 seasons in Tercera División

External links
Official website 
La Preferente team profile 
Arefepedia team profile 

Football clubs in Catalonia
Football clubs in Barcelona
Association football clubs established in 1909
1909 establishments in Spain